Wroughtonia is a genus of braconid wasps in the family Braconidae. There are at least 30 described species in Wroughtonia.

Species
These 39 species belong to the genus Wroughtonia:

 Wroughtonia acuta Yan & Chen g
 Wroughtonia alba Chou & Hsu, 1998 g
 Wroughtonia albobasalis van Achterberg & Chen g
 Wroughtonia areolata Yan & van Achterberg g
 Wroughtonia atkinsoni Gupta & Sharma, 1976 c g
 Wroughtonia bifurcata Yan & van Achterberg g
 Wroughtonia brachygena Yan & Chen g
 Wroughtonia breviantennata Yan & Chen g
 Wroughtonia brevicarinata Yan & Chen, 2014 g
 Wroughtonia castaneae (Viereck, 1912) c g
 Wroughtonia chui Yan & Chen g
 Wroughtonia cincticornis (Kieffer, 1921) c g
 Wroughtonia claviventris Wesmael, 1835 g
 Wroughtonia cornuta Cameron, 1899 c g
 Wroughtonia eurygenys Yan & Chen g
 Wroughtonia ferruginea (Brues, 1907) c g
 Wroughtonia frigida (Cresson, 1873) c g
 Wroughtonia grandis (Ashmead, 1889) c g
 Wroughtonia granulosa Gupta & Sharma, 1976 c g
 Wroughtonia hei Yan & Chen g
 Wroughtonia himachali Gupta & Sharma, 1976 c g
 Wroughtonia indica Singh, Belokobylskij & Chauhan, 2005 g
 Wroughtonia jiangliae van Achterberg & Chen g
 Wroughtonia ligator (Say, 1824) c g
 Wroughtonia mikagei Hedqvist & Togashi, 1979 c g
 Wroughtonia nigrifemoralis Yan & van Achterberg g
 Wroughtonia obtusa Yan & van Achterberg g
 Wroughtonia occidentalis (Cresson, 1865) c g
 Wroughtonia petila Chou & Hsu, 1998 c g
 Wroughtonia pterolophiae Chou & Hsu, 1998 c g
 Wroughtonia rugosa Yan & Chen g
 Wroughtonia sibirica Tobias, 1967 g
 Wroughtonia spinator (Lepeletier, 1825) c g
 Wroughtonia striata Gupta & Sharma, 1976 c g
 Wroughtonia truncata Gupta & Sharma, 1976 c g
 Wroughtonia unicornis (Turner, 1918) c g
 Wroughtonia varifemora Yan & Chen g
 Wroughtonia yaanensis Yan & Chen g
 Wroughtonia zhejiangensis Yan & van Achterberg g

Data sources: i = ITIS, c = Catalogue of Life, g = GBIF, b = Bugguide.net

References

Further reading

External links

 

Parasitic wasps